William Freeman may refer to:

William Freeman (martyr) (1558–1595), English Roman Catholic priest and martyr
William Freeman (politician) (died c. 1801), land surveyor and politician in Nova Scotia
William Henry Freeman (1844–1911), American Civil War soldier
William M. Freeman, writer for The New York Times
William T. Freeman (born 1957), American computer scientist
Bill Freeman (author) (born 1938), Canadian author
Bill Freeman (racing driver)

See also
William Peere Williams-Freeman (1742–1832), Royal Navy officer